Phillippe Sidney de Quetteville Cabot (18 July 1900 – 12 December 1998) was a New Zealand rugby union player. A wing-forward, Cabot represented South Canterbury and Otago at a provincial level, and was a member of the New Zealand national side, the All Blacks, in 1921. He left the field injured in his only match for the All Blacks, against New South Wales in Christchurch.

Following the death of Johnstone Richardson in 1994, Cabot was the oldest living All Black.

References

1900 births
1998 deaths
Columbia University alumni
Harvard University alumni
New Zealand international rugby union players
New Zealand rugby union players
Otago rugby union players
People educated at Timaru Boys' High School
Princeton University alumni
Rugby union players from Otago
Rugby union wing-forwards
South Canterbury rugby union players
University of Otago alumni